Lepidomys is a genus of snout moths. It was described by Achille Guenée in 1852.

Species
 Lepidomys bilinealis Dyar, 1914
 Lepidomys cecropia (Druce, 1895)
 Lepidomys costipunctata Amsel, 1956
 Lepidomys irrenosa Guenée, 1852
 Lepidomys proclea (Druce, 1895)

References

Chrysauginae
Pyralidae genera